Primrose Path is a 1940 film about a young woman determined not to follow the profession of her mother and grandmother, prostitution. It stars Ginger Rogers and Joel McCrea. The film was the novel February Hill by Victoria Lincoln (uncredited for legal reasons).

Marjorie Rambeau was nominated for the Academy Award for Best Supporting Actress.

Plot

Tomboy Ellie May Adams (Ginger Rogers) keeps her virtue despite her difficult circumstances. Her alcoholic, Greek scholar father Homer (Miles Mander) is unemployable, leaving her loving mother Mamie (Marjorie Rambeau) to support the family by going out with men. Her ex-prostitute grandmother (Queenie Vassar) sees nothing wrong with their shared profession.

One day, Ellie May warily accepts a ride to the beach from Gramp (Henry Travers). Gramp runs a beachside restaurant and gas station along with wisecracking Ed Wallace (Joel McCrea). Ellie May falls in love with Ed and eventually, after lying to him about being thrown out by her family over him, gets him to marry her. She becomes an industrious, well-liked waitress in the restaurant.

However, she makes a grave mistake when she finally agrees to take Ed to meet the rest of her family. When her lies about her relations are revealed, Ed leaves her. To add to her woes, her father accidentally shoots her mother during one of his drunken, half-hearted attempts at suicide. Before she dies, Mamie gets Ellie May to promise to take care of the family.

When Ellie May cannot find work, in desperation, she finally takes up the family profession. Thelma (Vivienne Osborne), Mamie's friend and co-worker, arranges for Ellie May to accompany her, her current boyfriend, and "Mr. Smith" (an uncredited Charles Lane) on a car trip to San Francisco. On the way, Ellie May gets them to stop at Ed's favorite nightclub, where she bitterly pretends to be what her husband thinks she is. However, after a private talk with a sympathetic Mr. Smith, Ed figures out the truth and takes Ellie May back. He also accepts the burden of her family.

Cast

Reception
The film made a profit of $110,000.

References

External links
 
 
 
 

1940 films
American black-and-white films
Films about prostitution in the United States
American films based on plays
Films directed by Gregory La Cava
1940 romantic drama films
American romantic drama films
1940s American films